Nameless (French title: Les anonymes) is a 2021 Rwandan drama film directed by Mutiganda Wa Nkunda in his directorial debut. The film was screened at the 27th edition of the FESPACO, where it won a prize for Best Scenario. It was inspired by a senseless crime Nkunda witnessed in Kigali, and by Ken Loach's 1966 film Cathy Come Home.

Synopsis 

The film was based on real events of the difficult life of a pair young lovers from Kigali, and their tragic descent into violence.

Cast 

 Yves Kijyana (as Philibert)
 Colombe Mukeshimana (as Kathy)

References

External links 
 

Kinyarwanda-language films
2021 drama films
Rwandan drama films
2021 films